Newton is a city in Baker County, Georgia, United States. As of the 2020 census, the city population was 602. The city is the county seat of Baker County.

History
Newton was founded in 1837. That same year, the seat of Baker County was transferred to Newton from Byron.

There are several properties in Newton listed on the National Register of Historic Places: Baker County Courthouse (Georgia), Notchaway Baptist Church and Cemetery, and Pine Bloom Plantation.

Geography
Newton is located at  (31.316804, -84.339549).

Demographics

According to the census of 2000, there were 851 people, 320 households, and 228 families residing in the city. The racial makeup of the city was 43.60% White, 53.94% African American, 0.12% Native American, 0.94% from other races, and 1.41% from two or more races. Hispanic or Latino people of any race were 2.00% of the population.

There were 320 households, out of which 38.1% had children under the age of 18 living with them, 38.1% were married couples living together, 28.8% had a female householder with no husband present, and 28.8% were non-families. 25.6% of all households were made up of individuals, and 11.3% had someone living alone who was 65 years of age or older.  The average household size was 2.66 and the average family size was 3.17.

In the city, the population was spread out, with 28.8% under the age of 18, 10.2% from 18 to 24, 29.0% from 25 to 44, 17.3% from 45 to 64, and 14.7% who were 65 years of age or older.  The median age was 33 years. For every 100 females, there were 81.1 males.  For every 100 females age 18 and over, there were 78.8 males.

The median income for a household in the city was $26,563, and the median income for a family was $27,386. Males had a median income of $30,417 compared to $17,885 for females. The per capita income for the city was $13,832, and  About 27.4% of families and 28.8% of the population were below the poverty line, including 37.3% of those under age 18 and 18.6% of those age 65 or over.

Education

There is one K-12 school building for the Baker County School System. It is located on State Route 37 and was named Baker County Elementary/Middle School in 2001. The old school building that housed the students near the courthouse was built in the late 1960s and named East Baker School. It served the local black population during segregation, and now houses the East Baker Historical Society and 21st Century Community Corporation. The high school was returned to Newton for the 2007–2008 school year. From 1980 to 2007, the high school students traveled from Newton to Camilla for high school, formerly Mitchell-Baker High School. The old building is now used for the Baker County Headstart Center. The new gym for Baker County Schools was expected to be completed in 2009.

Gallery

References

External links
East Baker Historical Society & 21st Century Community Corporation, Inc.

Cities in Georgia (U.S. state)
Cities in Baker County, Georgia
County seats in Georgia (U.S. state)
Populated places established in 1837
1837 establishments in Georgia (U.S. state)